Gina Pareño (born Geraldine Acthley; October 20, 1947) is a multi-awarded Filipino actress. She is referred to as the 'Queen of Philippine Melodrama', best known for her critically acclaimed portrayals in Kubrador (2006), Serbis (2008) and Kasal, Kasali, Kasalo (2006).

Pareño gained notoriety with movies like Mama (1968). She was the first Filipino actress to receive an acting award at the 3rd Asian Film Awards, won 'Best Actress' at the Pacific Meridian International Film Festival and another 'Best Actress' nods at the Osian Cinefan Festival of Asian and Brussels International Independent Film Festival. Apart from having multiple international recognitions, Pareño also gained acclaims from the critics for her performance in Kasal, Kasali, Kasalo, winning 'Best Supporting Actress' at the FAMAS Awards, Film Academy of the Philippines Awards and Metro Manila Film Festival.

In a career spanning five decades, Pareno has since solidified her reputation as one of the country's most gifted actresses. In 2010, she was honored with a 'Lifetime Achievement Award' at the 26th PMPC Star Awards for Movies. In 2011, Pareño was also recognized as one of the 'Artist of the Decade' at the 34th Gawad Urian Awards. In 2021, she was honored with an 'Icon Award' at the 4th EDDYS (Entertainment Editors’ Choice) Awards for her contribution to the Philippine industry.

Early life
Pareño was born to a German American father and a Filipina mother.

Career
She started her career in the 1960s as an extra in several films and then later on became one of the artists of Sampaguita Pictures. In 2006, she gained international recognition for her role in Kubrador (The Bet Collector) wherein she won the Best Actress award at the Osian's Cinefan Festival of Asian and Arab Cinema and at the Brussels International Independent Film Festival. Pareño also won the Metro Manila Film Festival Award for Best Supporting Actress as an outspoken and brash mother in the movie Kasal, Kasali, Kasalo and then later on received accolades for the same film and category in the FAMAS Awards as well as the Film Academy of the Philippines Awards in that same year.

Pareño and co-actress Jaclyn Jose were cited in the 61st Cannes Film Festival in 2008 for their performance in Brillante Mendoza's Serbis. The film earned several recognitions including a Best Actress award for Pareño at the 6th Pacific Meridian International Film Festival and an Asian Film Award for Best Supporting Actress.

Personal life
In 2022, Pareño came out as part of the LGBT community.

Filmography

Television

Film

Awards and nominations

International awards

Philippine awards

ref:

References

External links
 
 article on Pareño with bio

1949 births
Living people
ABS-CBN personalities
Actresses from Manila
Best Supporting Actress Asian Film Award winners
Filipino film actresses
Filipino people of American descent
Filipino people of German descent
Filipino women comedians
GMA Network personalities
People from Pandacan
Tagalog people
TV5 (Philippine TV network) personalities
20th-century Filipino actresses
21st-century Filipino actresses
Filipino television actresses
21st-century LGBT people
Filipino LGBT actors